Circle is a studio album by Scala & Kolacny Brothers released in 2010.

Track listing

Credits 
Writing, performance and production credits are adapted from the album liner notes.

Personnel

Scala & Kolacny Brothers 
 Scala – choir
 Stijn Kolacny – vocal conduct
 Steven Kolacny – piano, keyboards, arrangement

Additional musicians 
 Koen Buyse – additional sounds on "Lithium", "It Never Will Come Back", "Splinter", "Seashell", "Raintears", "Paper Plane", "A Little More Each Time", "Magic"
 David Demeyere – drums on "It Never Will Come Back", "Splinter", "Seashell", "Raintears", "Paper Plane", "A Little More Each Time", "Magic"

Production 
 Filip Heurckmans – recording, mixing, mastering
 Koen Buyse – production on "It Never Will Come Back", "Splinter", "Seashell", "Raintears", "Paper Plane", "A Little More Each Time", "Magic"
 Bas Reemans – engineering (drums only)

Visual art 
  – artwork
 Jane Stockdale – photography
 Joris Ceuppens – photography
 Ignace van Parys – photography
 Bert Ceulemans – photography

Studios 
 Galaxy Studio, Mol, Belgium
 Art Sound Studio, Houthalen-Helchteren, Belgium

Charts

References

External links 
 
 Circle at Scala & Kolacny Brothers's official website

2010 albums
Covers albums